Soon Hee Newbold is an American composer, conductor, musician, and actress.

Early life
Newbold was born in South Korea and adopted as an infant. She spent her childhood growing up in Frederick, Maryland with two sisters.  Newbold began studying piano at age five and violin at age seven winning prestigious competitions and performing as a concert artist at an early age.  As a soloist and in professional orchestras  throughout the world, Newbold appeared in venues such as Carnegie Hall, The Kennedy Center, Wolf Trap, Disney World, Aspen Music Festival and School, and Tanglewood and in many countries throughout the world.

Newbold attended Frederick High School where her interests included science, languages, and drama.  She studied German, French, and Russian and completed an internship in AIDS and Cancer research at the National Institutes of Health in Fort Detrick, Maryland, under Dr. David Derse.  Newbold received her Bachelor of Music degree from James Madison University where she concentrated on film scoring, orchestration, and audio production.  During college, she also performed in professional symphonies in Virginia, Maryland, and New York and was the winner twice of the JMU School of Music Concerto Competition performing Violin Concerto (Khachaturian) her Freshman year and Tzigane by Ravel as a Senior.

Career
Upon graduation, Newbold worked in entertainment for Walt Disney World and performed in various symphonies in Florida.  She also produced albums and wrote for recording projects and ensembles.  As an actress, Newbold expanded her experiences to film and television.  She got her first break in the film, The Waterboy, starring Adam Sandler, and first major role in the family comedy, Camp Tanglefoot with Gregg Russell, Drew Seeley, and Michael Andrew.  A highly sought after prolific and published composer, Newbold's compositions can be heard around the world in film, orchestras, and other performing groups.  She frequently travels the world as a guest composer, conductor, and clinician and her works have been performed at Carnegie Hall, Lincoln Center for the Performing Arts, The Kennedy Center, Walt Disney Concert Hall and the Midwest Clinic.

Personal life
Newbold currently lives in Southern California with her husband.  She works in film, television, and commercial projects as a producer, actress, composer, and musician.  Newbold is also a proficient martial artist and trained in various weapons.  She has a 3rd degree black belt in Tae Kwon Do, 2nd degree black belt in Hapkido, and a black belt in Kigumdo (Korean swords) similar to Kendo.  Her mother was diagnosed with Huntington's disease, a terminal genetic neurological illness for which there is very little treatment and no cure.  Newbold wrote the song Endless Dreams, and dedicated it to those affected by Huntington's to spread awareness and hope.

Music

String orchestra
American Landscape (2006)
Appalachian Hymn (2005)
Arabian Dreams (2003)
Battle (2023)
Calypso Sea (2019)
Celtic Roots (2002)
Celtic Sunrise (2020)
Country Hoedown (2011)
Dance of the Samodivi (2007)
Desert Sands (2008)
Dragon Dances (2003)
Egyptian Legacy (2006)
Elementa: I. Flights of Fancy, II. Terra, III. Fire and Ice (2022)
Equuleus (2008)
Fan Dance (2012)
Fantasía Española (2005)
Fire Dance (2007)
Gaelic Castle (2009)
A Gypsy Tale (2005)
The Haunted Carousel (2009)
A Hero's Journey (2007)
Hiawatha (2003)
Honor and Glory (2008)
Iditarod (2010)
Invicta: for Solo Violin and Orchestra (2021)
Irish Faire (2011)
Jubilee Fanfare (2016)
A Knight's Quest (2005)
Le froid de l'hiver (The Cold of the Winter) (2004)
Legend of Dark Mountain (2007)
Lion City (2009)
Medieval Kings (2010)
Mystic Caravan (2012)
Mythos (2006)
North Star to Freedom (2008)
The Odyssey: Journey of Odysseus (2004)
Orion and the Scorpion (2012)
Perseus (2009)
A Pirate's Legend (2004)
Rhythm 'n' Blues (2006)
Rhythms of Africa (2010)
Riders in the Night (Life of a Cowboy) (2008)
Rock Riffs (2011)
Rockin' Jammin' Swingin''' (2002)The Russian Music Box (2004)Ships of Ireland (2004)A Soldier's Hymn (2008)Song of the Sea Mariner (2006)Spirit of the American West (2003)Storm (2015)Viking (2014)Voyager (2020)Warrior Legacy (2010)The Wild Western Frontier (2007)

Full orchestraAlpha and Omega (2020)American Landscape (2017)Egyptian Legacy (2014)A Pirate's Legend (2014)Warrior Legacy (2013)

Concert bandStorm (2020)

ArrangementsHallelujah Chorus from "Messiah" by G.F. Handel (2009)Herr Mannelig by Swedish Traditional (2023)Irish Legend by Robert Kerr (2008)Olaf and the Elf Maiden (Ólafur Liljurós) by Icelandic Traditional (2014)Slane (Be Thou My Vision) by Irish Traditional (2010)Sleepers Wake by J.S. Bach (2009)Thriller (as performed by Michael Jackson) by Rod Temperton (2023)

Film scoresForever Home: A Glimpse Into Dog Rescue (2014)Ghost Rock (2004)

SongsEndless Dreams (1999)Johnny, Come On Home (2004)Pinches of Salt, Prisms of Light (2000)True Friends (1992)

Method books and collectionsNew Directions for Strings'' (The FJH Music Company, Inc.)

Filmography

References

External links

American women classical composers
American classical composers
Living people
American film actresses
People from Seoul
People from Frederick, Maryland
Actresses from Maryland
American adoptees
South Korean adoptees
South Korean emigrants to the United States
American classical pianists
American women classical pianists
American classical violinists
American television actresses
Women conductors (music)
American actresses of Korean descent
Musicians from Maryland
James Madison University alumni
Year of birth missing (living people)
21st-century American conductors (music)
21st-century classical pianists
21st-century American women pianists
21st-century classical violinists
21st-century American pianists
American hapkido practitioners
South Korean hapkido practitioners
21st-century American violinists